Peter William Postlethwaite,  (7 February 1946 – 2 January 2011) was an English actor best known for his work as a character actor.

After minor television appearances including The Professionals, Postlethwaite's first major success arose through the British autobiographical film Distant Voices, Still Lives (1988). He had a breakthrough in Hollywood when he portrayed David in Alien 3 (1992) and his international reputation was further solidified when he was nominated for the Academy Award for Best Supporting Actor for In the Name of the Father. Following this role, he portrayed the mysterious lawyer Mr. Kobayashi in The Usual Suspects and went on to appear in a wide variety of films.

On television, Postlethwaite played Sergeant Obadiah Hakeswill in Sharpe. Director Steven Spielberg called him "the best actor in the world" after working with him on Amistad (1997). He was made an Officer of the Order of the British Empire in the 2004 New Year Honours list. Less than one month after his death, he was nominated for the BAFTA Award for Best Actor in a Supporting Role for his performance in The Town (2010).

Early life
Peter William Postlethwaite was born into a working-class Catholic family in Warrington on 7 February 1946, the son of Mary Geraldine (née Lawless; 1913–2000) and cooper, wood machinist, and school caretaker William Postlethwaite (1913–1988). He had an older brother named Michael (1944–2006) and two older sisters named Patricia and Anne. He would later portray Irish characters on multiple occasions, leading some to mistakenly believe he was of Irish descent.

Postlethwaite attended St Benedict's RC Junior School and a seminary, then joined West Park Grammar School in St Helens, where he enjoyed sports including rugby league. He spent an extra year re-sitting some of his O-levels, and then took four A-levels in English, history, geography, and French. Before his acting career, he trained as a teacher and became the first male drama teacher at Loreto College in Manchester. He initially trained to be a Catholic priest, but later settled on a career in acting. He trained as an actor at the Bristol Old Vic Theatre School in 1970.

Career
Early in his career, Postlethwaite was advised to adopt a new surname for his acting work by his first agent and by peers who quipped that his name "would never be put up in lights outside theatres because they couldn't afford the electricity". He rejected the advice. He started his career at the Everyman Theatre in Liverpool, where his colleagues included Bill Nighy, Jonathan Pryce, Antony Sher, Matthew Kelly, and Julie Walters, having an intimate relationship with the latter during the mid-to-late 1970s.

In 2003, he toured Australia and New Zealand in a 90-minute one-man play, Scaramouche Jones, in which he played a clown trying to find out why he is who he is before he dies at midnight, receiving a nomination for the TMA Award for Best Actor and winning the Theatregoers' Choice Award for Best Solo Performance. This was directed by Rupert Goold, who would also direct his Lear in 2008, in which Postlethwaite played every character. As well as Australia, the play toured Canada, New Zealand and the UK to great acclaim.

In The Art of Discworld (2004), Terry Pratchett wrote that he had always imagined Sam Vimes as 'a younger, slightly bulkier version of Pete Postlethwaite'.

Steven Spielberg called Postlethwaite "the best actor in the world" after working with him on The Lost World: Jurassic Park, to which Postlethwaite quipped: "I'm sure what Spielberg actually said was, 'The thing about Pete is that he thinks he's the best actor in the world.'" Postlethwaite next starred in a Liverpool stage production of King Lear in 2008 at the Everyman Theatre, Liverpool, and at the Young Vic, London. He appeared in the climate change-themed film The Age of Stupid, which premiered in March 2009.

Terminally ill, Postlethwaite made a return to Hollywood in three 2010 films, first as Spyros in Clash of the Titans. He next appeared in the blockbuster hit Inception as Maurice Fischer, an industrialist who is slowly dying. Lastly, his performance in The Town as florist and crime boss Fergus "Fergie" Colm was well received by critics, making several publications' lists of Oscar predictions for Best Supporting Actor. His final appearance on screen was in Nick Hamm's film Killing Bono, based on the memoir of Neil McCormick. The role was written specially for Postlethwaite to accommodate his illness. The film was released on 1 April 2011. He was scheduled to be in the BBC series Exile, but had to pull out because of ill health and was replaced by Jim Broadbent.

Activism
Postlethwaite appeared as a taxi driver in a political broadcast for the Labour Party during the 1997 general election, and marched in London against the Iraq War in 2003.

Postlethwaite was active in calling for action on climate change, and installed a wind turbine in his garden; he wrote in The Sun, "The stakes [of climate change] are very, very high. They're through the roof. How could we willingly know that we're going into extinction ... and let it happen?" At the UK premiere of The Age of Stupid in 2009, he told then-Secretary of State for Energy and Climate Change Ed Miliband that he would return his OBE and vote for any party other than Labour if the Kingsnorth coal-fired power station was given the go-ahead by the Labour government.

Personal life
Postlethwaite lived in West Itchenor before moving near Bishop's Castle. He was a lifelong supporter of Liverpool FC. He began a relationship with former BBC producer Jacqueline Morrish in 1987, and they were married in 2003 at St Nicholas' Church in West Itchenor. They had a son, actor Billy Postlethwaite (born 1989), and a daughter, Lily Postlethwaite (born 1996).

Health issues and death
Postlethwaite was diagnosed with testicular cancer in 1990, and had his right testicle removed. A smoker from the age of 10 until his death, he said during a 2009 interview with Scotland on Sunday, "We've got to hope the next generation will do things differently. I'm sure that in 20 years' time the kids will say: 'Can you believe that people actually used to smoke – put these funny little things in their mouths, lit them and sucked all that crap into their lungs?"

Postlethwaite was diagnosed with pancreatic cancer in March 2009, and continued acting for the next year and a half, showing clear signs of weight loss during his last performances. On 2 January 2011, at the age of 64, he died at the Royal Shrewsbury Hospital in Shrewsbury. In his final two years, he worked on his memoir A Spectacle of Dust with writer Andy Richardson, which was published in June 2011.

Filmography

Film

Television

References

External links

 
 
 
 
 Daily Telegraph Obituary

1946 births
2011 deaths
20th-century English male actors
21st-century English male actors
Alumni of Bristol Old Vic Theatre School
Alumni of St Mary's University, Twickenham
Deaths from cancer in England
Deaths from pancreatic cancer
English male film actors
English male Shakespearean actors
English male stage actors
Male actors from Lancashire
English male television actors
English Roman Catholics
Labour Party (UK) people
Officers of the Order of the British Empire
Male actors from Warrington
People from West Itchenor